Marko Topo (born 13 September 2003) is a German tennis player.

Topo has a career high ATP singles ranking of World No. 437 achieved on 29 August 2022.

Career

2021: ATP debut
Topo made his ATP main draw debut at the 2021 Belgrade Open after receiving a wildcard for the singles main draw.

In September 2021, he obtained his first challenger level win, in Banja Luka, thanks to a wild card, defeating compatriot Danilo Petrović 4–6, 7–6, 6–2. In the next round he then defeated Vitaliy Sachko, winning 7-6 in the third set, thus reaching the quarterfinals and landing in the top 1000 for the first time.

2022: Top 500
In April 2022, he got a qualifications wildcard for ATP Munich, where he defeated 4th seed Henri Laaksonen in straights sets and Norbert Gombos in three sets to qualify for his second ATP main draw, where he lost to the German Oscar Otte in the first round.

In Hamburg he qualified for his first ATP 500 tournament after receiving also a wildcard but lost in the first round to Alex Molčan. He reached the top 500 at World No. 498 on 1 August 2022.

References

External links
 
 

2003 births
Living people
Serbian male tennis players
German male tennis players